Boris Akunin is the pen name of Grigori Chkhartishvili (born 20 May 1956), a Russian-Georgian writer. He is best known as writer of detective and historical fiction. He is also an essayist and literary translator. Grigory Chkhartishvili has also written under pen names Anatoly Brusnikin, Anna Borisova, and Akunin-Chkhartishvili. His characters include Erast Fandorin, Nicholas Fandorin and Sister Pelagia.

Life and career
Chkhartishvili was born in Zestaponi to a Georgian father and a Jewish mother and lived in Moscow from 1958 until 2014. Since then he has lived between Britain, France and Spain. Influenced by Japanese Kabuki theatre, he joined the historical-philological branch of the Institute of Asian and African Countries of Moscow State University as an expert on Japan. He was engaged in literary translation from Japanese and English. Japanese authors Yukio Mishima, Kenji Maruyama, Yasushi Inoue, Masahiko Shimada, Kobo Abe, Shinichi Hoshi, Takeshi Kaiko, Shohei Ooka were published in his translation, as well as representatives of American and English literature (T. C. Boyle, Malcolm Bradbury, Peter Ustinov, etc.).

He worked as assistant to the editor-in-chief of the magazine Foreign Literature, but left in October 2000 to pursue a career as a fiction writer.

Under his given name of Grigory Chkhartishvili, he serves as editor-in-chief of the 20-volume Anthology of Japanese Literature, chairman of the board of a large "Pushkin Library,” and is the author of the book The Writer and Suicide (Moscow, The New Literary Review, 1999). He has also contributed literary criticism and translations from Japanese, American and English literature under his own name.

Since 1998 he has been writing fiction under the pseudonym “B. Akunin". Decoding "B" as "Boris" appeared a few years later, when the writer began to be frequently interviewed. 

Under the pseudonym Boris Akunin, he has written many works of fiction, mainly novels and stories in the series The Adventures of Erast Fandorin, The Adventures of Sister Pelagia, The Adventures of the Master (following Nicholas Fandorin, Erast's grandson), all published in Russia by Zakharov Books, and the Roman-Kino ("Novel-Film") series set during World War I. Akunin's specialty is historical mysteries set in Imperial Russia. It was only after the first books of the Fandorin series were published to critical acclaim that the identity of B. Akunin (i.e., Chkhartishvili) was revealed.

Chkhartishvili "prefers to work with historical material" and has been called the "undisputed champion" of Russian crime fiction given that as Boris Akunin he "has written more than a dozen crime novels and has been widely appreciated by discerning readers ... and has been translated into many languages."

"Akunin" (悪人) is a Japanese word that translates to "great bad man". In his novel The Diamond Chariot, the author redefines an "akunin" as a great evil man who creates his own rules. He publishes critical and documentary works under his real name.

Akunin has been critical of Vladimir Putin's domestic and foreign policies, including the annexation of Crimea in 2014. In 2012, Putin attributed Akunin's critical attitudes to his Georgian background.

He resides in a flat near St. Paul's Cathedral in London.

Awards and honors
In the year of 2000, Akunin was nominated for the Smirnoff-Booker Prize. In September 2000, Akunin was named Russian Writer of the Year and won the "Antibooker" prize in 2000 for his Erast Fandorin novel Coronation, or the last of the Romanovs.

In 2003, the British Crime Writers' Association placed Akunin's novel The Winter Queen on the short list for the Dagger Award in Fiction. In 2004, he was a member of the jury at the 26th Moscow International Film Festival.

On August 10, 2009 for the contribution to the development of cultural ties between Russia and Japan was awarded the prize of the Japan Foundation acting under the auspices of the government. 

Laureate of the Noma Prize (2007, Kodansha Publishing House, Japan) - "For the best translation from Japanese of works of the writer Yukio Mishima".

Adaptations
Three Fandorin novels, The Winter Queen, The Turkish Gambit, and The State Counsellor, were made into big-budget Russian movies. Azazel was re-apdated as a TV Show named Fandorin. Azazel, produced by Yandex Studios and Kinopoisk streaming service.

An English remake of The Winter Queen was in production. It was set to start filming in 2007, but the leading actress, Milla Jovovich, became pregnant, and the production process was delayed to unknown date.

Pelagia and the White Bulldog was made into a TV mini-series in 2009, while The Spy Novel came out in a 2012 theatrical release as Spy.

List of works
Erast Fandorin series (publication dates in parentheses). Each historical mystery novel is assigned its own subgenre of detective fiction (conspiracy, political, etc.):
The Winter Queen, original title Azazel / Азазель (1998). A conspiracy mystery. 1876. The 20-year-old Fandorin begins his career by accidentally stumbling over a plot for world domination.
The Turkish Gambit / Турецкий гамбит (1998). A spy mystery. 1877. Fandorin takes part in the Russo-Turkish War and the Siege of Plevna as he is trying to uncover a Turkish spy.
Murder on the Leviathan, original title Leviathan / Левиафан (1998). A closed set-up mystery. 1878. Fandorin investigates a murder while traveling on a steamship headed from England to India. 
The Death of Achilles / Смерть Ахиллеса (1998). A hired assassin mystery. 1882. Upon returning from diplomatic service in Japan, Fandorin tackles the mysterious death of Mikhail Skobelev (called Sobolev in the novel) in a Moscow hotel.
Special Assignments:
The Jack of Spades / Пиковый валет (1999). A novella about confidence men. 1886. Fandorin hunts down a clever gang of swindlers.
The Decorator / Декоратор (1999). A novella about a maniac. 1889. After ending his string of murders in England, Jack the Ripper surfaces in Moscow.
The State Counsellor / Статский советник (1999). A political mystery. 1891. Revolutionary terrorism in late 19th-century Russia takes center stage, as Fandorin is pursuing a group of daring radicals.
The Coronation / original title Coronation, or the Last of the Romanovs (Коронация, или Последний из Романов) (2000). A high society mystery. 1896. The plot surrounds the ascension of Tsar Nicholas II, whose family is being blackmailed by an international supervillain.
She Lover of Death / Любовница смерти (2001). A decadent mystery. 1900. A decadent suicide society causes a stir in Moscow.
He Lover of Death / Любовник Смерти (2001). A Dickensian mystery. Simultaneously with the decadent society investigation, Fandorin is looking into a series of murders in the slums of Khitrovka, Moscow.
The Diamond Chariot / Алмазная колесница (2003). An ethnographic mystery. Events of the Russo-Japanese War of 1905 set against a flashback to Fandorin's diplomatic service in Yokohama in 1878.
Ying and Yan /Инь и Ян (2006). A play about Erast Fandorin, set in 1882.
The Jade Rosary / Нефритовые четки (2006). Seven short stories and three novellas set between 1881 and 1900. Some of the "holes" in the narrative are filled, including Fandorin's service in Japan, his investigations in the 1880s while a Deputy for Special Assignments in the Moscow city administration and his adventures in America.
All the World's a Stage / Весь мир театр (2009). A theatrical mystery. 1911. The 55-year-old Fandorin has his life turned upside-down when investigating strange incidents in a fashionable Moscow theater.
The Black City / Черный город (2012). 1914. While pursuing a daring Bolshevik terrorist, Fandorin goes to the Azerbaijani capital Baku, where his wife is shooting a motion picture.
Planet Water / Планета Вода (2015). Three novellas set between 1903 and 1912: Planet Water (1903, a treasure hunt in the Atlantic), A Lonely Sail (1906, a cruel murder of an abbess from a distant monastery), and Where Shall We Paddle? (1912, a pursuit of a cruel train robber in Poland).
Not Saying Goodbye / Не прощаюсь (2018). A novel set between 1918 and 1921. In his final adventure, Erast Fandorin finds himself in a country radically transformed by the Revolution and the Russian Civil War.

Note: (The Jack of Spades and The Decorator were published together in a single volume, Special Assignments: The Further Adventures of Erast Fandorin / Особые поручения.)

Sister Pelagia series (about a crime-solving nun in turn-of-the-20th-century provincial Russia):
Pelagia and the White Bulldog / Пелагия и белый бульдог  (2000). A bishop of a large Volga province sends an astute nun Pelagia to look into mysterious deaths of his aunt's prize-winning dogs.Pelagia and the Black Monk / Пелагия и черный монах (2001). Mysterious events in a remote monastery force bishop Mitrofani to start an inquiry, which only leads to more tragedy.Pelagia and the Red Rooster / Пелагия и красный петух (2003). A stranger who has started a new sect in provincial Russia becomes the focus of sinister and deadly plots.

Nicholas Fandorin series (about Erast Fandorin's grandson, a modern-day British historian):Altyn Tolobas / Алтын-толобас  (2000). Nicholas visits Russia in 1995 to investigate artifacts left by his ancestor, Cornelius von Dorn, a German soldier in the service of the Russian czar in the 17th century. Cornelius's story is told in alternating chapters.Extracurricular Reading/ Внеклассное чтение (2002). Nicholas' adventures in Moscow in 2001 are told together with a story of a 7-year-old prodigy entangled in a regicidal plot at the end of Catherine the Great's reign.F.M. (2006). Nicholas is looking for a lost Dostoevsky manuscript, a fictional original draft of Crime and Punishment written as a detective novel.The Falcon and the Swallow / Сокол и Ласточка (2009). Nicholas and his British aunt are looking for a treasure in the Caribbean. The origin of the treasure is told in a story about Laetitia von Dorn (Cornelius's niece) set in 1702.

The Genres Project (novels written in different fiction genres, each book's title refers to the particular genre):
Children's Book / Детская книга (2006). Erast Fandorin Jr. (Nicholas' ten-year-old son) goes on a time-travelling adventure.
Spy Novel / Шпионский роман (2005). Set in 1941, just before Hitler's invasion of the Soviet Union. State security officers are on the trail of a deeply embedded German spy.
Science Fiction / Фантастика (2006). Two young men cope with their mysteriously acquired superpowers in the Soviet Union's dying days.
Quest / Квест (2008). In 1930, an Indiana Jones-like American scientist and two of his colleagues go to Moscow in an attempt to disrupt Soviet eugenics experiments. The novel imitates a computer game. The second part of the narrative, called Codes to the Novel is set in 1812, during Napoleon's invasion of Russia.
Children's Book For Girls / Детская книга для девочек (2012). Co-authored with Gloria Mu. Angelina Fandorina (Erast Jr.'s twin sister) goes on a time-traveling, world-saving quest of her own.Brüderschaft with Death (A "cinematic novel", written as a collection of ten novellas ("films") about the rivalry between Russian and German intelligence during World War I. Each "film" is written in a different cinematic genre. There are two main characters in the series: Alexei Romanov and Sepp von Theofels). The following "films" have been released in Russian:The Infant and the Devil / Младенец и черт (2007). Comedy. July 1914. A German ace of espionage is trying to steal the plans of Russian military operations, as a young St. Petersburg student unexpectedly interferes.The Torment of a Broken Heart / Мука разбитого сердца (2007). Melodrama. November 1914. Junior sergeant Alexei Romanov, sent away from the front after being wounded, takes part in an operation in Switzerland, where Russian intelligence is attempting to neutralize a "dealer in secrets."The Flying Elephant / Летающий слон (2008). Aeronautic adventures. April 1915. Captain von Theofels infiltrates Russia's Special Aviation Corps in order to sabotage the development of the world's first heavy bomber, the Sikorsky Ilya Muromets.Children of the Moon / Дети Луны (2008). A decadent étude: August 1915. Ensign Romanov, fresh after completing the Russian General Staff's counter-intelligence course, goes undercover into a Petrograd society of young decadents. One of the members is about to transfer a copy of secret military documents to a German spy.The Wandering Man / Странный человек (2009). Mystical. December 1915. Major von Theofels is trying to discredit the head of Russian military intelligence. To achieve his goal he is trying to get close to a mysterious "Wanderer" who greatly resembles the historical Grigory Rasputin. The Russian title plays with the double meaning of the word "странный": wandering (archaic meaning) and strange, weird.Let the Thunder of Victory Rumble! / Гром победы, раздавайся! (2009). Front-line sketch. April 1916. Junior lieutenant Romanov's adventures at Russia's South-Western Front, as he is trying to ensure the secrecy of the plans for the impending Brusilov Offensive.Mariya, Maria... / "Мария", Мария ... (2010). A true tale of the sea. October 1916. Major von Theofels has a new assignment, to sabotage the Russian battleship Imperatritsa Mariya.Nothing Sacred / Ничего святого (2010). A hellish scheme of the Germans. November 1916. Von Theofels and his nemesis Alexei Romanov are about to meet again as the German spy is preparing an assassination of Czar Nicholas II. This time, Romanov, now a lieutenant, is a much more worthy opponent.Operation Transit / Операция "Транзит" (2011). Preapocalyptic. April 1917. With Russia facing political turmoil after the February Revolution, the Germans hope to further the collapse by helping the Bolshevik leader V. I. Lenin return to the country. Major von Theofels' new assignment is to ensure his safe passage.The Angels Battalion / Батальон ангелов (2011). Apocalyptic. Summer 1917. With Russia's ability to sustain the war at an end and the army demoralized, the Russian Provisional Government creates the Women's Battalion of Death in order to boost the soldiers' morale. Stabskapitän Alexei Romanov joins the strange outfit as an instructor.

History of the Russian State (История Российского государства). A series of non-fiction books documenting the history of Russia from the 9th century to 1917, complemented by a series of fictional works.A Part of Europe - From the beginnings to the Mongol Conquest | Часть европы - От истоков до монгольского нашествия (2013). History of Russian statehood from its beginnings (9th century) up to the Mongol Conquest (early 13th century).The Fiery Finger | Огненный перст (2013). Three historical novellas set between the 9th and 13th centuries: The Fiery Finger (the adventures of a Byzantine spy in the Slavic lands in 856 AD), The Devil's Spittle (political games at the court of Yaroslav the Wise in 1050) and Prince Cranberry (about a young ruler of a tiny duchy, located dangerously close to the Wild Steppe, in 1205).A Part of Asia - The Horde Period | Часть Азии - Ордынский период (2014). History of Russian statehood under the Mongol rule (from early 13th century to mid-15th century).Bosch and Schelm | Бох и Шельма (2014). Two historical novels. The first novel tells of a horrific invasion of Tartars (Mongols) in 1237 and is narrated from both the Russian and Mongolian perspectives, falling into the Tragic Genre. The second novel is about the adventures of a smart swindler who is wandering around Russia and the neighbouring countries on the eve of dramatic events – the great Battle of Koulikovo in 1380 where the united Russian army faced the army of the Golden Horde. The novel is comical and belongs to the Picaresque genre.Between Asia and Europe - From Ivan III to Boris Godunov | Между Азией и Европой - От Ивана III до Бориса Годунова (2015). History of Russian statehood from Ivan III (mid-15th century) up to Boris Godunov (first years of the 17th century).Widow's card or Widow's kerchief | Вдовий плат (2016). Two historical novels. Widow's card is set in the times of Ivan III, while The mark of Cain takes place during Ivan IV's reign.Between Europe and Asia - The Seventeenth Century | Между Европой и Азией - Семнадцатый век (2016). Russia's emergence from The Time of Troubles and the reigns of the early Romanovs.Sennight of the Three-Eyed | Седмица Трехглазого (2017). A historical detective novel, relaying the life of a 17th-century Moscow sleuth and a play To Kill The Snakelet about Peter the Great's coup to overthrow princess Sophia Alekseyevna. Asiatic Europeization - Czar Peter Alexeyevich | Азиатская европеизация - Царь Пётр Алексеевич (2017). The reign of Peter the Great foundation of the Russian Empire.Nutshell Buddha | Ореховый Будда (2018). A novel about the adventures of a Japanese monk and an orphan Russian girl in Peter the Great's Russia.Eurasian Empire - The Era of Czarinas|Евразийская империя - Эпоха цариц (2018). Post-Peter 18th century Russia, including the reign of Catherine the Great.Goodventures and Ruminations of Lucius Katin|Доброключения и рассуждения Луция Катина (2019). A novel set in the middle of the 18th century, focusing on an idealistic young man and his desire to bring about progress and enlightenment.The First Superpower - Alexander the Blessed and Nicholas the Unforgettable|Первая сверхдержава - Александр Благословенный и Николай Незабвенный (2019). Russia's rise and fall as a European superpower during the reigns of Alexander I and Nicholas I.

Non-series books:
The Seagull / Чайка, Комедия в двух действиях (2000). A reworking of Anton Chekhov's Seagull as a mysteryComedy/Tragedy / Комедия/Трагедия (2000). Two plays, Hamlet, a Version and Mirror of Saint GermainFairy Tales for Idiots / Сказки для Идиотов (2000). A collection of short stories, not related to any of the series.Screenplays / Сценарии (2006). Original screenplays written by Akunin for three of his novels.Photos as Haiku / Фото как хокку (2011). A collection of biographical stories sent in by the readers of Akunin's blog.The Most Frightening Villain and other stories / Самый страшный злодей и другие сюжеты (2012). A collection of blog posts from 2010 to 2011.A Real Princess and other stories / Настоящая принцесса и другие сюжеты (2013). A collection of blog posts from 2011 to 2012.
 The most mysterious secret and other stories / Самая таинственная тайна и другие сюжеты (2014). A third collection of blog posts.
 The Northern sentry and other stories / Северный Часовой и другие сюжеты (2015). A fourth collection of blog posts.

As Grigory Chkhartishvili:The Writer and Suicide / Писатель и самоубийство (1999). A non-fiction study of suicide in literary circles throughout history.Cemetery Tales / Кладбищенские истории (2004). Written as both Boris Akunin and Grigory Chkhartishvili, the book consists of literary essays about cemeteries in different parts of the world, each accompanied by a macabre short story. One of the short stories (Shigumo) features Erast Fandorin, and is included in The Jade Rosary.

As Boris Akunin-Chkhartishvili:Aristonomia / Аристономия (2012). Akunin's first attempt to write "serious literature", as opposed to genre fiction. The novel is set during the turmoil of the February and October Revolutions and the Russian Civil War, with philosophical ruminations on the nature and development of human dignity woven into the plot.Another Way / Другой Путь ' (2015). The novel is set in 1927, as Joseph Stalin is consolidating power. The main character finds true love and continues his philosophical work, now on the subject of intimacy and love's transformative powers.Happy Russia / Счастливая Россия (2017). The story continues in 1937, at the height of Stalin's purges. A secret society of Moscow freethinkers, who philosophized about an ideal future for their country, is investigated by the secret police.Tresorium / Трезориум (2019). A novel theory of primary education is explored in the Warsaw Ghetto, and a young Soviet officer seeks his destiny in War-ravaged Europe.

Plans

As Akunin has indicated in interviews, the Sister Pelagia series is finished (only three books were ever planned) and so, in all likelihood, is the Nicholas Fandorin series. The Alexei Romanov/Sepp von Theofels series, planned for 10 novellas, was completed in 2011. The other two projects will continue. In particular, Akunin plans to write two more Erast Fandorin books, both collections of short stories and novellas, similar in structure to The Jade Rosary and taking place entirely during the 20th century.

The Genres project may continue as well, with Akunin possibly exploring new genres. He has also stated he may write more Akunin-Chkhartishvili novels to continue the story and to further develop the ideas from Aristonomy.

In March 2013, Akunin announced in his blog that he was going to wind down his career in detective fiction (though he still plans to finish the Erast Fandorin series as promised) and begin concentrating his energy on a new big project, History of the Russian State. He plans to write eight volumes of history, from the Middle Ages to the Russian Revolution, aiming to make it completely "non-ideological" yet interesting to read. Accompanying each volume of history, there will be a book of fiction taking place in the same time period. All the fiction pieces will be parts of one, long family saga. The first part of the project was released in November, 2013. It includes two volumes, A Part of Europe (a volume of history, covering the period between the formation of the Kievan Rus in the 9th century and the beginning of the Mongol conquest of Russia in the 13th century) and The Fiery Finger (a collection of three novellas, set in the same time period). The second part was released in 2014, and the third part in 2015/2016.

Anatoly Brusnikin
In November 2007, AST, one of the publishing houses with which Akunin is affiliated, came out with a historical mystery novel by a new author, Anatoly Brusnikin, called Девятный спас (Devyatny Spas, The Ninth Savior). Despite the fact that Brusnikin was a complete unknown, AST spent lavishly on an advertising campaign for the book, which almost immediately resulted in rumors that Brusnikin might actually be Akunin in a new disguise.

The rumors about the authorship of Devyatny Spas were also fueled by the total secrecy surrounding the person of the author and the fact that his name, A. O. Brusnikin, is an exact anagram of Boris Akunin. AST has also released a photograph of Brusnikin, which greatly resembled Chkhartishvili's face.

In January 2012, two years after the second Brusnikin novel was published and just prior to the release of the third one, Chkhartishvili admitted in his blog that it was indeed him hiding under a new nom-de-plume. The reason for creating another alter ego was Akunin's desire to write historical novels without a mystery component and to attempt a "Slavophile" look at Russian history in lieu of his usual "Westerner" outlook. The Brusnikin "photograph" was revealed to be a combination of Chkhartishvili's face with the face of a studio designer who made the picture.

To date, three Brusnikin novels have been written.The Ninth Savior / Девятный Спас (2007). Set in the beginning of Peter the Great's reign, it follows the lives of three friends (clearly modeled after the Three Bogatyrs of the Russian folk tales) and a scion of the Romanovs named Vasilisa (modeled after Vasilisa the Wise) and their involvement in a series of sinister plots.A Hero of A Different Time / Герой иного времени (2010). An homage to Lermontov's A Hero of Our Times, it is set during the Caucasus War in the early 1840s.Bellona / Беллона (2012). The Crimean War is the main subject.

Akunin has said he has no definite plans to write more Brusnikin novels, though he remains open to the possibility.

Anna Borisova
At about the same time as Brusnikin had made his appearance, Chkhartishvili's other disguise, Anna Borisova, hit the bookstores relatively undetected. In this literary experiment Chkhartishvili wanted to attempt to write as a woman and to get away from detective and adventure fiction. Similar to the Brusnikin ruse, the "photograph" of Borisova released by the publisher was actually a combination of Chkhartishvili's face with that of his wife.
Borisova's work, though not overly complicated, is more literary and philosophical in nature. There were three Borisova novels written.There... / Там ... (2007). Victims of a terrorist attack in Moscow experience afterlife, each in accordance with their very different beliefs.The Idea-Man / Креативщик (2009). A mysterious stranger walks the streets of Saint Petersburg, telling people strange and fascinating stories.Vremena goda (2011). Set in a French retirement home for Russian-speaking clientele. The main characters are a young Muscovite doctor suffering from a potentially fatal brain aneurism and a supercentenarian owner of the home incapacitated by the locked-in syndrome.

Akunin has said that he will not write any more Borisova novels "unless I get a sex-change (surgery)."

References

External links

 Akunin's site (contains the full text of ten novels)
 Akunin's personal blog
 Fandorin.ru Official Site of Erast Fandorin and other Akunin characters
 The Erast P. Fandorin Virtual Museum
Akunin.net Akunin's published books in Russian, English, German and French, last updated in 2005
Times online interview with Boris Akunin
Boris Akunin: the Evil Spirit or Good Luck of Modern Russian Fiction?
2002 AEI paper analyzing Akunin's works
Russian library site containing the full texts of most of Akunin's novels, including all three Pelagia novels, two Nicholas Fandorin novels, and all Erast Fandorin books except The Jade Rosary and All the World's a Stage''
 
in 2022 Boris Akunin co-founded True Russia - anti war charitable organization that supports Ukrainian refugees 

1956 births
Living people
20th-century pseudonymous writers
20th-century Russian dramatists and playwrights
20th-century Russian translators
21st-century pseudonymous writers
21st-century Russian dramatists and playwrights
21st-century Russian translators
Moscow State University alumni
Recipients of the Order of the Rising Sun, 4th class
Russian people of Georgian descent
Russian people of Jewish descent
Writers from Tbilisi
Russian crime fiction writers
Russian historical novelists
Writers of historical mysteries
Russian-language writers
Detective fiction writers
Russian emigrants to France
Russian emigrants to the United Kingdom
Russian activists against the 2022 Russian invasion of Ukraine